KTBO-TV (channel 14) is a religious television station in Oklahoma City, Oklahoma, United States, owned and operated by the Trinity Broadcasting Network (TBN). The station's transmitter is located near the John Kilpatrick Turnpike/Interstate 44, on Oklahoma City's northeast side.

History
The channel 14 allocation in Oklahoma City was first assigned to KLPR-TV, which operated from May 31, 1966 to December 1967 as an independent station.

KTBO-TV first signed on the air on March 6, 1981, and was one of several partner stations that were built and signed on by TBN, instead of being acquired from another company. It was also the fourth TBN partner station to sign on (after flagship station KTBN-TV in Santa Ana, California, KPAZ-TV in Phoenix, Arizona and WHFT-TV in Miami, Florida). The current channel 14 (as KTBO) operates under a different license and has never claimed KLPR-TV as part of its history.

In September 1989, KTBO engaged in a campaign encouraging viewers to call local cable providers Cox Communications (which served Oklahoma City proper) and Multimedia Cablevision (which served most of the city's suburbs before its Oklahoma systems were acquired by Cox in 1999) and tell them to protest premium cable channel Cinemax's broadcast of Martin Scorsese's The Last Temptation of Christ, which had garnered controversy among the religious community a year before for its depiction of Jesus Christ in an alternate reality after being tempted by what he later discovers to be Satan in the form of a beautiful child (particularly for depicting Christ imagining himself engaged in sexual activities). Although Multimedia responded by blacking out all of Cinemax's broadcasts of the film, Cox refused to preempt the broadcasts and briefly dropped KTBO from its lineup.

TBN filed a special temporary authority request on November 5, asking to be allowed to remain dark for 180 days while it seeks a temporary transmitter facility from which it can resume broadcasts until the Hefner Road tower is rebuilt. In January 2021, KTBO resumed over-the-air transmission of its TBN programming under a temporary leasing agreement with The Edge Spectrum, Inc., relayed in standard definition over the second digital subchannel of KUOT-CD (channel 21). KTBO resumed over-the-air broadcasts via its new transmission tower on September 18, 2021.

Technical information

Subchannels
KTBO-TV began transmitting a digital television signal on UHF channel 15 on December 1, 2002.

References

External links

Trinity Broadcasting Network affiliates
Television channels and stations established in 1981
1981 establishments in Oklahoma
TBO-TV